Orlando Nappe (c. 1931 in Buenos Aires – 2007) was an Argentine footballer. He capped 121 matches (as a defender and as a midfielder) scoring 11 goals.

He played for Club Atlético Huracán (1950–1952) and Argentinos Juniors (1956–1959).

External links
 Orlando Nappe at BDFA.com.ar 

1931 births
2007 deaths
Footballers from Buenos Aires
Argentinos Juniors footballers
Club Atlético Huracán footballers
Association football midfielders
Argentine footballers